Oflag IV-A was a World War II German POW camp for officers located in the 15th-century Burg Hohnstein, in Hohnstein, Saxony.

Camp history
The castle was first used as a camp in 1933–34, named KZ Hohnstein. As a Schutzhaftlager ("protective custody camp"), it held political prisoners, mostly members of the Communist Party, who were forced to work in a nearby quarry.

The camp was reopened on 1 October 1939 to house Polish generals and their staffs captured during the German September 1939 offensive. On 15 May 1940 most of them were transferred to Oflag IV-B Koenigstein.

By September 1940 the prisoners at the camp were mainly French, with 100 officers up the rank of colonel, and 28 generals. There were also seven Dutch and 27 Polish generals, with orderlies. By the end of October 1940 all these prisoners had been transferred to other camps, and the castle was then used to accommodate evacuee children from Hamburg and Berlin.

German records indicate the camp was in existence until April 1945.

Post-war it housed refugees and displaced persons until 1948.

Prominent inmates
 General Juliusz Rómmel 
 General Tadeusz Kutrzeba 
 General Walerian Czuma 
 General Edmund Knoll-Kownacki 
 General Franciszek Kleeberg
 General Emil Krukowicz-Przedrzymirski (7 July - 29 October 1940)

See also
 Oflag
 List of prisoner-of-war camps in Germany
 Kemna concentration camp

References 
Notes

Bibliography
 Eggers, Reinhold (1961) Colditz - The German Side of the Story (edited and translated by Howard Gee) New York: W. W. Norton & Company

Oflags